Number 22 Squadron of the Royal Air Force is an operational testing and evaluation squadron for all the Joint Helicopter Command helicopter types including Chinook, Puma HC2, Merlin HC4, Apache and Wildcat AH1. Formerly the Rotary Wing Operational Evaluation and Training Unit, the highly experienced helicopter aircrew will also ensure frontline crews have Qualified Warfare Instructors to support them on operations worldwide. The squadron was reformed in May 2020 to serve as the Joint Helicopter Command Operational Evaluation Unit.

The squadron previously operated the Westland Sea King HAR.3 and HAR.3A at three stations in the southern United Kingdom. It was originally formed in 1915 as an aerial reconnaissance unit of the Royal Flying Corps serving on the Western Front during the First World War. Becoming part of the Royal Air Force on its formation in 1918, it was disbanded the following year as part of the post-First World War scaling back of the RAF. During the Second World War the squadron operated in the torpedo bomber role over the North Sea and then in the Mediterranean and the Far East. Between 1955 and 2015 the squadron provided military search and rescue over the United Kingdom.

History

1915–19

The squadron was formed at Fort Grange, Gosport on 1 September 1915 from a nucleus of men and equipment split off from No. 13 Squadron. The squadron trained on a variety of aircraft types, including the Royal Aircraft Factory BE.2c, the Maurice Farman Shorthorn, the Bleriot XI and the Curtiss JN-3. It received its intended operational type, the Royal Aircraft Factory FE.2b in February 1916, passing 14 BE.2s to 33 Squadron.

The squadron moved to France on 1 April 1916, and soon settled down to carrying out reconnaissance missions over the front lines. It flew fighter patrols during the Battle of the Somme in July 1916, in addition to its normal reconnaissance and photography duties in support of the army. One notable casualty during the Somme was Auberon Herbert, 9th Baron Lucas, the former Liberal politician and cabinet minister, who was wounded when attacked by German fighter aircraft on 3 November 1916, and died of his wounds the same day.

From July 1917, the squadron started to replace its FE.2s with faster and more capable Bristol F.2 Fighters also known as the 'Brisfit', receiving its full complement of 18 aircraft by 24 August. This was in time to allow the squadron to take part in the Battle of the Menin Road Ridge in September 1917. The squadron was heavily deployed during the German spring offensive of 1918, and was forced to change bases due to the German advance, and later, as the Allies drove the Germans out of France in the Hundred Days Offensive, changed bases to keep up with the Allied advances.

The squadron moved to Spich, near Cologne in Germany as part of the British Army of Occupation in March 1919, leaving for home at the end of August that year. After a period as a cadre unit (without aircraft) at RAF Ford, the squadron formally disbanded on 31 December 1919.

1923
The squadron's second incarnation was as one of two test squadrons (the other being 15 Squadron) supporting the Aeroplane Experimental Establishment at Martlesham Heath, Suffolk. For 10 years following its reformation on 24 July 1923, the squadron was involved in testing new aircraft before they were accepted for service or sold overseas. The two test squadrons were disbanded on 1 May 1934.

1934–45
The squadron reformed again on 1 May 1934 at RAF Donibristle near Edinburgh, Scotland in the torpedo bomber role, flying Vickers Vildebeest I biplanes. From March 1935, the squadron began to re-equip with the improved Vildebeest III, with a more powerful engine and carrying an observer as a third crew member. In October 1935, as part of Britain's response to the Abyssinia crisis, the squadron was deployed to Malta, returning to Britain in August 1936 after the threat of war between the United Kingdom and Italy receded.

On 14 December 1936, part of the squadron was detached to form 42 Squadron, also equipped with the Vildebeest, while in March 1938, 22 Squadron moved south to RAF Thorney Island.

The squadron was still equipped with the Vildebeest when the Second World War broke out in September 1939, with the squadron carrying out anti-submarine patrols over the English Channel. From November 1939 the squadron started to receive Bristol Beaufort twin-engined monoplanes to replace its obsolete biplanes. The Bristol Taurus engines of the Beaufort proved unreliable at first, and the squadron continuing to fly operations with the Vildebeest while converting to the Beaufort. It flew its last operational mission with the Vildebeest on 20 December 1939.

The squadron moved to RAF North Coates in Lincolnshire on 8 April 1940, flying its first operational sorties from that base on 15 April when nine Beauforts set out to lay mines off the mouth of the River Elbe.

In this role, the unit flew sorties over the North Sea from North Coates, Thorney Island, St Eval and Portreath.

In 1942, the unit was posted to North Africa before being moved to South East Asia, where it converted to the Bristol Beaufighter. No. 22 Squadron continued its anti-shipping role, this time using rockets. The squadron disbanded for the third time a month after war's end.

Search and rescue (1955–2015)

Sycamore years

Reformed again in February 1955 with the Bristol Sycamore HC.12 at RAF Thorney Island, the squadron took on the Search and Rescue role with this helicopter until the Westland Whirlwind replaced it in June 1955. The squadron performed military search and rescue until it was handed over to the Maritime & Coastguard Agency and Bristow Helicopters in October 2015.

Whirlwind years

The squadron was initially equipped with Westland Whirlwind HAR.2s until August 1962, these were later replaced by the Whirlwind HAR.10s from August 1962. The squadron was based at RAF Thorney Island.

June 1955 - June 1956 - HQ at RAF Thorney Island
 Unknown Flight - RAF Valley, Anglesey
 Unknown Flight - RAF Felixstowe, Suffolk
 Unknown Flight - RAF Martlesham Heath, Suffolk
June 1956 - April 1974 - HQ at RAF St Mawgan, Cornwall
 Unknown Flight - RAF Chivenor, Devon
 Unknown Flight - RAF Felixstowe, Suffolk
 Unknown Flight - RAF Tangmere, West Sussex
 Unknown Flight - RAF Thorney Island, West Sussex
 Unknown Flight - RAF Valley, Anglesey
 Unknown Flight - RAF Manston, Kent
 Unknown Flight - RAF Coltishall, Norfolk
April 1974 - January 1976 - HQ at RAF Thorney Island
 Unknown Flight - RAF Valley, Anglesey
 Unknown Flight - RAF Chivenor, Devon
 B flight               - RAF Coltishall, Norfolk
 Unknown Flight - RAF Brawdy, Pembrokeshire
January 1976 - June 1976 - HQ at RAF Finningley
 Unknown Flight - RAF Valley, Anglesey
 Unknown Flight - RAF Chivenor, Devon
 Unknown Flight - RAF Brawdy, Pembrokeshire
 Unknown Flight - RAF Leuchars, Fife
 Unknown Flight - RAF Manston, Kent
 Unknown Flight - RAF Leconfield, East Riding of Yorkshire

Wessex years

The squadron was re-equipped with Westland Wessex's from June 1976. Its headquarters were at RAF Finningley and it had flights at:

'A' Flight – RAF Chivenor, Devon
'B' Flight – RAF Leuchars, Fife (stood down 1 April 1993)
'C' Flight – RAF Valley, Anglesey
'D' Flight – RAF Leconfield, East Riding of Yorkshire
'E' Flight – RAF Manston, Kent and RAF Coltishall, Norfolk (stood down 21 July 1994)

Sea King years

Finally, in the mid-1990s, the squadron received six newly built Westland Sea King HAR.3A to supplement the Sea King HAR.3 aircraft which replaced the Wessex aircraft. The squadron HQ was co-located with the SAR Force HQ at RAF Valley on Anglesey, Wales. Detachments of at least two aircraft operated from three stations providing search and rescue cover in those parts of the country; these were:

'A' Flight – RMB Chivenor, Devon
'B' Flight – RAF Wattisham, Suffolk
'C' Flight – RAF Valley, Anglesey
'D' Flight - RAF Lossiemouth, Moray

A and B Flights operated the Sea King HAR.3A. C Flight shared a pool nominally of five Sea King HAR.3 aircraft with 203 (R) Sqn, the Operational Conversion Unit.

Prince William, Duke of Cambridge served in the squadron from 2010 to 2013. At the end of 2015, the squadron was stood down and the Sea Kings disposed of when RAF Search and Rescue's responsibilities were handed over to a civilian contractor Bristow.

In July 2015, C Flight stood down with A Flight following on 5 October 2015.

Notable rescues
On 11 November 1962, the FV Jeanne Gougy ran aground and capsized at Land's End, Cornwall. Eight of her twenty crew were rescued by helicopter or breeches buoy. Sergeant Eric Smith was awarded a George Medal for his actions.
Boscastle flood of 2004 – The Boscastle flood of 2004 occurred on Monday, 16 August 2004 in the villages of Boscastle and Crackington Haven in Cornwall. The villages suffered extensive damage after flash floods caused by an exceptional amount of rain that fell over the course of eight hours that afternoon. Two Sea Kings from A-Flight at RMB Chivenor, Rescue's 169 and 170, were called and help to rescue some of the 100 people who were airlifted out.

Test and evaluation (2020–present)
No. 22 Squadron reformed on 14 May 2020 at RAF Benson, Oxfordshire, as the Operational Evaluation Unit for the Joint Helicopter Command.

Honours and awards
In addition to the battle honours listed above (which are emblazoned on the Squadron Standard), the squadron has been granted the following battle honours: Cambrai 1917, Somme 1918, Lys, Amiens, France and Low Countries 1940, Invasion Ports 1940, Biscay Ports 1940–1941.

Despite atrocious weather having prevented the other aircraft in the mission from reaching the harbour and, with virtually no chance of pulling out of the harbour, Campbell pressed home his attack and badly damaged the ship, being shot down in the process. He and his crew were buried with full military honours by the Germans in the cemetery at Brest.

In popular culture
 BBC "Helicopter Rescue" broadcast in February 2012.

See also
List of Royal Air Force aircraft squadrons
 RAF Search and Rescue Force
 202 Squadron – RAF Boulmer, RAF Lossiemouth, RAF Leconfield
 No. 1564 Flight RAF – RAF Mount Pleasant, Falkland Islands

References

Citations

Bibliography

Halley, James J. Famous Maritime Squadrons of the RAF, Volume 1. Windsor, Berkshire, UK: Hylton Lacy Publishers Ltd., 1973. .
Halley, James J. The Squadrons of the Royal Air Force & Commonwealth, 1918–1988. Tonbridge, Kent, UK: Air-Britain (Historians) Ltd., 1988. .
Harvey, William Frederick James. 'Pi' in the Sky: History of No.22 Squadron, Royal Flying Corps and R.A.F.in the War of 1914–18. Colin Huston, 1971. .

Jones, H.A. "The War in the Air: Being the Story of the Part Played by the Royal Air Force in the Great War: Vol. II". History of the Great War. Oxford: The Clarendon Press, 1928.
Jones, H.A. "The War in the Air: Being the Story of the Part Played by the Royal Air Force in the Great War: Vol. IV". History of the Great War. Oxford: The Clarendon Press, 1934.
Moyes, Philip J.R. Bomber Squadrons of the RAF and their Aircraft. London: Macdonald and Jane's (Publishers) Ltd., 1964 (new edition 1976). .
Rawlings, John D.R. Coastal, Support and Special Squadrons of the RAF and their Aircraft. London: Jane's Publishing Company Ltd., 1982. .
Rawlings, John D.R. Fighter Squadrons of the RAF and their Aircraft. London: Macdonald and Jane's (Publishers) Ltd., 1969 (new edition 1976, reprinted 1978). .

External links

 
 
 
 

022 Squadron
No. 22
Military units and formations established in 1915
Rescue aviation
Air force reconnaissance units and formations
Military of Hong Kong under British rule
1915 establishments in the United Kingdom